The soft sign (Ь, ь, italics Ь, ь) also known as the front yer, front jer, or er malak (lit. "small er") is a letter of the Cyrillic script. In Old Church Slavonic, it represented a short (or "reduced") front vowel. As with its companion, the back yer , the vowel phoneme that it designated was later partly dropped and partly merged with other vowels.

In the modern Slavic Cyrillic writing systems in which it appears (all East Slavic languages and Bulgarian and Church Slavic), it does not represent an individual sound but indicates palatalization of the preceding consonant.

Uses and meanings

Palatalization sign 

The soft sign is normally written after a consonant and indicates its softening (palatalization) (for example Ukrainian батько 'father'). Less commonly, the soft sign just has a grammatically determined usage with no phonetic meaning (like  'fanfare' and тушь 'India ink', both pronounced  but different in grammatical gender and declension). In East Slavic languages and some other Slavic languages (such as Bulgarian), there are some consonants that do not have phonetically different palatalized forms but corresponding letters still admit the affixing soft sign.

The modern Macedonian alphabet, based on the Serbian Cyrillic variant, has had no soft sign since its creation, in 1944.

Before a vowel in East Slavic languages 
Between a consonant and a vowel, the soft sign bears also a function of "iotation sign": in Russian, vowels after the soft sign are iotated (compare Russian льют  '(they) pour/cast' and лют  '(he is) fierce'). The feature, quite consistent with Russian orthography, promulgated a confusion between palatalization and iotation, especially because  usually precedes so-called soft vowels. The latter case, though, is rarely used in Russian (only in loanwords such as ) and can be seen as a replacement of phonetically identical , which gets rid of an "inconvenient" letter . In Ukrainian and Bulgarian, the spelling  indicates palatalization, not iotation.

Similarly, the soft sign may denote iotation in Belarusian and Ukrainian, but it is not used so extensively as in Russian. Ukrainian uses a quite different repertoire of vowel letters from those of Russian and Belarusian, and iotation is usually expressed by an apostrophe in Ukrainian. Still the soft sign is used in Ukrainian if the sound preceded by an iotated vowel is palatalized.

In Bulgarian 

As a vowel in Slavic studies 

In Slavistic transcription, Ь and Ъ are used to denote Proto-Slavic extra-short sounds  and  respectively (slověnьskъ adj. 'Slavonic'), like Old Slavonic orthography.

Digraphs

Аь
The soft sign does not occur after vowels in Slavic languages, but the  digraph for // or // was introduced to some non-Slavic Cyrillic-based alphabets such as Chechen, Ingush and various Dagestanian languages such as Tabasaran. This use of ь is similar to a trailing e as used in, for example, German, when umlauts are unavailable (cf. Goethe).

Consonants
Like the hard sign and the palochka, many languages use the soft sign forms digraphs to represent sounds which are phonetically similar, yet distinct phonemes from the bare letter.  For example, while г represents //, гь represents // in Crimean Tatar, // in Archi, and // in Avar and Tabasaran.

Representations 
Under normal orthographic rules, it has no uppercase form, as no word begins with the letter. However, Cyrillic type fonts normally provide an uppercase form for setting type in all caps or for using it as an element of various serial numbers (like series of Soviet banknotes) and indices (for example, there was once a model of old Russian steam locomotives marked "Ь" – :ru:Паровоз Ь).

Sometimes  is used, or the soft sign may be ignored if it is in a position that it does not denote iotation, for example: Тверь=Tver, Обь=Ob. It can also be transcribed "y" or "i" if preceding a vowel.

In Belarusian it is romanized as a combining acute, e.g., зь , ць , нь , ль .

Name of letter 
 , 
 
 , with unknown meaning

 Kazakh: жіңішкелік белгісі, lit. 'sign of softness', Kazakh pronunciation: [ʒɘŋɘʃkʲelɘk.bʲelɡɘsɘ]
 
 ,  or (archaic, mostly pre-1917 name)  
 , or simply , the hard sign  being named  or 
 ,

Related letters and other similar characters
 Latin letter B, which lowercase letter is nearly identical
Ъ ъ : Cyrillic letter Hard sign
Ҍ ҍ : Cyrillic letter Semisoft sign
Ѣ ѣ : Cyrillic letter Yat
Ы ы : Cyrillic letter Yery
Љ љ : Cyrillic letter Lje
Њ њ : Cyrillic letter Nje
' : Apostrophe
,   : I with bowl
 Й and Ј, Cyrillic letters

Computing codes

References